FILA grappling was a non-striking hybrid combat sport sanctioned by the International Federation of Associated Wrestling Styles (FILA). A form of submission wrestling influenced by freestyle wrestling, Greco-Roman wrestling, Brazilian jiu jitsu, judo, and sambo, it applied submission holds and choking techniques in order to make the opponent abandon the fight. In 2013 FILA ceased sanctioning the sport.
In 2014, FILA changed its name to United World Wrestling and reintroduced grappling.

History

Rules 
Since various forms of submission fighting are traditionally practiced both with and without gi, FILA implemented both trends in order to cover the full spectrum of techniques associated to each particular style. Therefore, FILA tournaments generally had gi and no-gi divisions to enable all submission fighters to compete to their highest ability no matter what their fighting background might be. The  FILA grappling gi practitioner's uniform was similar to a judogi, but often with tighter cuffs on the pants and jacket.  No-gi grapplers wore FILA-approved shorts and a tight-fitting sleeveless, short sleeve or long sleeve rashguard. Grapplers were not required to wear shoes during the match, but those who chose to wore FILA-approved shoes.

The FILA grappling regulations were based on a progressive point system that encourages submissions over technical points. Points were awarded for takedowns and dominant control positions according to the following progression: side mount < full mount < back mount. Once having reached a position and secured it for 3 seconds, additional points could only be scored if a higher position is achieved. The progression was reset if the opponent managed to bring the fight back to neutral (be it standing or on the ground) or to score a dominant control position in his or her turn.

FILA grappling rules contrasted with wrestling's greater emphasis on takedowns, due to its radically different point-scoring system. This has led to greater time dedicated to training on the ground, resulting in enhancement and evolution of groundwork techniques by grapplers.

World Grappling Championship

The world grappling championship was the most important of FILA's annual Grappling tournaments. The first of these competitions took place on in 2007, with the last taking place in 2013.

See also

 Brazilian Jiu-jitsu
 Wrestling
 Catch Wrestling
 Sambo
 Pankration

References

External links
 

Combat sports
Grappling
United World Wrestling
Submission wrestling